Ernest Frederick Gale FRS (15 July 1914 – 7 March 2005) was a British microbiologist. In 1952, Dr. Gale developed the microbial infallibility hypothesis, which states that the buildup of compounds initially resistant to biodegradation exerts a strong selective pressure on nearby microbes to evolve to consume them. This theory undergirds the fields of medical and environmental bioremediation.

References

External links
 http://www.timesonline.co.uk/article/0,,60-1616184,00.html
 http://www.socgenmicrobiol.org.uk/pubs/micro_today/obituaries.cfm

British microbiologists
Fellows of the Royal Society
1914 births
2005 deaths